Hussein al-Sheikh (born 1960) is a Palestinian politician. He is the secretary general of the Executive Committee of the Palestine Liberation Organization since 26 May 2022.

Biography
Hussein al-Sheikh was born in Ramallah in 1960 during a period of the Jordanian annexation of the West Bank.

Political life 
al-Sheikh head of the General Authority of Civil Affairs of the Palestinian National Authority since 2007. He was first elected as a member of the Central Committee of Fatah in 2008. 

On 25 June 2022, the Executive Committee of the Palestine Liberation Organization reaffirmed Hussein al-Sheikh as secretary general and head of the Negotiations Affairs Department of the Palestine Liberation Organization.

References

External links

 "A New Palestinian Leader Rises in the West Bank. He’s Very Unpopular", the New York Times, 15 July 2022.

1960 births
Living people
Central Committee of Fatah members
Government ministers of the Palestinian National Authority
Members of the Executive Committee of the Palestine Liberation Organization
People from Ramallah